A football player or footballer is a sportsperson who plays one of the different types of football. The main types of football are association football, American football, Canadian football, Australian rules football, Gaelic football, rugby league and rugby union.

It has been estimated that there are 250 million association football players in the world, and many play the other forms of football.

Career
Jean-Pierre Papin has described football as a "universal language". Footballers across the world and at almost any level may regularly attract large crowds of spectators, and players are the focal points of widespread social phenomena such as association football culture.

Footballers generally begin as amateurs and the best players progress to become professional players. Normally they start at a youth team (any local team) and from there, based on skill and talent, scouts offer contracts. Once signed, some learn to play better football and a few advance to the senior or professional teams.

Wages
Wages in some top leagues are significantly higher than in other jobs. Players in the Premier League earn average wages of about $1 million per year. In the wealthiest clubs in European football leagues, some players earn an average wage up to $6 to $8 million per year. The best players of those clubs can earn up to $70 million per year.

However, only a fraction of men's professional football players is paid at this level. Wages may be much more moderate in other divisions and leagues, and a significant number of players are semi-professional. For example, the average annual salary for footballers in  Major League Soccer for the 2013 season was $148,693, with significant variations depending on the player position (goalkeepers for example earned $85,296, whereas forwards earned $251,805).

Popularity and average salaries in women's leagues are far lower. For example, players in the National Women's Soccer League (NWSL) (which started in 2012) earn $15,000 to $40,000 per year as of January 2017.

Post-retirement

A minority of retired footballers continue working full-time in football, for instance as football managers. A 1979 study reported that former first-team ballplayers were over-represented as top-ranking executives in their companies and had greater income mobility than second-teamers and reserves. However, some experience chronic health issues, see below.

Skills and specialties

Association football specialties (positions)

In association football, there are four traditional types of specialties (positions): goalkeepers (goalies), defenders (full-backs), midfielders (half-backs), and forwards (attackers). Special purpose positions include such performers as sweepers, stoppers, second forwards (under-attackers), wingers, insiders, etc.
 Goalkeepers: good reflexes, communication with defence, one-on-one ability, command of the penalty area and aerial intelligence.

 Centre-backs: good heading and tackling ability, height, bravery in attempting challenges, concentration.

 Full-backs: pace, stamina, anticipation, tackling and marking abilities, work rate and team responsibility.

 Central midfielders: stamina, passing ability, team responsibility, positioning, marking abilities.

 Wingers: pace, technical ability like dribbling and close control, off-the-ball intelligence, creativity.

 Forwards: finishing ability, composure, technical ability, heading ability, pace, off-the-ball intelligence.

American football

The American football teams' positions are categorized by a form of play where each of it has own spectrum of positions. Those are offensive, defensive and special teams.

Australian football

Psychological aspects of performance
Research shows that association football players that take less than 200ms after the referee blows their whistle for a penalty kick are significantly more likely to miss scoring than those that take over a second.

Health issues

An Irish 2002 study of association and Gaelic football players characterized players as "lean and muscular with a reasonably high level of capacity in all areas of physical performance". The opposite is the case for American football, where obesity could be the cause of grave health problems.

A 2000 study documented injuries sustained by Czech [association] football players at all levels:

 Patellar tendinitis (knee pain) is considered an injury that comes from overexertion, which also happens to other athletes of virtually every sport. It is a common problem that football players develop and can usually be treated by a quadriceps strengthening program. Jumping activities place particularly high strains on the tendon and with repetitive jumping, tearing and injury of the tendon can occur. The chronic injury and healing response results in inflammation and localized pain.

Although levels of depression and pain in retired football players are on par with the societal average, some players suffer from post-retirement chronic injuries. Head injuries are a particular concern.

Life expectancy
Studies have long shown former American football NFL players have a higher life expectancy than the general public or males with a similar age and race distribution, but a higher rate of cardiovascular issues. A study comparing the deaths of former Major League Baseball players found baseball players lived longer still, perhaps suggesting a "healthy worker" bias where NFL athletes lived less long than they would otherwise have, despite their longer than average life expectancy.  A 2009 review of the evidence in the American Journal of Medicine concluded the existing evidence "did not suggest an increased mortality" but does "suggest increased cardiovascular risk..., particularly the heavier linemen."

As for association football, a 2011 German study found that German national team players live 1.9 years less than the general male population.

A 1983 study of rugby players found that the life expectancy of All Blacks is the same as for the general population.

Australian rules footballers have reduced death rates compared to the general population.

Head

American football players are prone to head injuries such as concussions. In later life, this increases the risk of dementia and Alzheimer's. Professional American football players self-reporting concussions are at greater risk for having depressive episodes later in life compared with those retired players self-reporting no concussions.

Probably due to the repeated trauma associated with heading balls, professional association football has been suggested to increase the incidence of amyotrophic lateral sclerosis. In a 1987 study of former Norwegian association football national team players, one third of the players were found to have central cerebral atrophy, i.e. brain damage. A 1999 study connected soccer to chronic traumatic head injury (CTHI):

Knee
Anterior cruciate ligaments are particularly vulnerable in most types of football due to injuries that can be sustained during tackles.

Hip
An increased incidence of osteoarthritis in the hip joint has been found in retired football players.

Muscles
A 2012 study of association football injuries found that 19% of all injuries were muscle injuries, of which 54% affected the thigh muscles.

Sleep and psychological functioning
In a 2009 study, association football was found to be associated with favourable sleep patterns and psychological functioning in adolescent male football players.

The rate of suicide among NFL vets has been found to be 59% lower than in the general population.

FIFA response
In 2012, FIFA released a paper intended to identify key risk factors for association football players.

Longevity and factors of mortality 
In 2015, a systematic review of a sample of fifty-four peer-reviewed publications and three articles on elite athletes’ mortality and longevity, resulted in major longevity outcomes for the elite athletes (baseball, football, soccer, basketball, and cycling) "compared to age-and sex-matched controls from the general population and other athletes." The span longevities were influenced by factors like the type of sport, the playing position, the race, and the energy system.

International level 
An observational study held from professional footballers -active (during career) and recently retired (post career, aged more than 45 years)- of 70 countries between 2007 and 2013, elaborated on data of the World Footballers' Union (FIFPro), recorded 214 deaths of which 25% was caused by accidents, 11% by suicides and 33% by a suspected cardiac pathology (on an overall 55% of deaths caused by a some sort of disease).

Clinical evaluation, ECG and echocardiography are required for the athletes as pre-participation tools in order to prevent sudden cardiac deaths on people aged less than 35. To evaluate the risk of myocardial fibrosis, may use and recommended the additional use of alte gadolinium enhancement (LGE) with pre- and post-contrast and extracellular volume fraction (ECV) images. Even encouraged, it wasn't yet made mandatory.

North America 
In 2015, it was conducted an analysis of 205 deaths among North American professional athletes who were registered as active at the time of their decease. Data were collected by the four major sports: National Basketball Association (NBA), National Football League (NFL), National Hockey League (NHL), and Major League Baseball (MLB). The NFL and NBA active players resulted in "a higher likelihood of dying in a car accident" and in a significantly higher likelihood of dying from a cardiac-related illness compared to the NHL and MLB active populations.

In 2013, a study on 3.439 retired athletes of the National Football League s with at least 5 credited playing seasons between 1959
and 1988 didn't show any statistical correlation between suicide mortality and professional activity and particularly football-related compared with the general control sample. No stratification was reported between speed and non-speed position players.

Italy 
Until the 2000s a very limited number of formal studies has been published on mortality from all causes in soccer players, despite the high interest of the public to the matter.
An extended study held in Italy between 1975 and 2003 on a total of 5.389 players, age 14–35 years, highlighted that, while the mortality for cancer and cardiovascular diseases among the football players cohort was significantly lower than the general Italian population, the "mortality rates for amyotrophic lateral sclerosis and car accidents were significantly higher than expected, and for ALS the risk is 18 times than expected."

Lists of players
Lists of association football players
List of American football players

List of footballers (Gaelic football)
:Category:Lists of rugby league footballers

See also
Sports unions

References

Terminology used in multiple sports
Player
Player
Lists of football people
Gaelic footballers
+
Player